Mordellistena aureomicans is a species of beetle in the genus Mordellistena of the family Mordellidae. It was described in 1965 and is endemic to the Canary Islands.

References

aureomicans
Beetles described in 1965
Endemic fauna of the Canary Islands